Omphalotropis fragilis  is a species of minute salt marsh snail with an operculum, a terrestrial gastropod mollusk, or micromollusk, in the family Assimineidae. This species is endemic to Micronesia.

References
 

Fauna of Micronesia
Omphalotropis
Assimineidae
Taxonomy articles created by Polbot